In the United States, an excess profits tax is a tax on any profit above a certain amount. A predominantly wartime fiscal instrument, the tax was designed primarily to capture wartime profits that exceeded normal peacetime profits to prevent perverse incentives for manufacturers to engage in war profiteering and warmongering.

History

United Kingdom
In Great Britain in World War I, the Treasury rejected proposals for a stiff capital levy, which the Labour Party wanted to use to weaken the capitalists. Instead, there was an excess profits tax, of 50 percent of profits above the normal prewar level; the rate was raised to 80 percent in 1917.  Excise taxes were added on luxury imports such as automobiles, clocks and watches. There was no sales tax or value added tax at this time in Britain.

United States
In 1863, the Confederate congress and the state of Georgia experimented with excess profits taxes, perhaps the first time it has happened in American history.

The first effective American excess profits tax was enacted in 1917, with rates graduated from 20 to 60 percent on the profits of all businesses in excess of prewar earnings but not less than 7 percent or more than 9 percent of invested capital. In 1918, a national law limited the tax to corporations and increased the rates. Concurrent with this 1918 tax, the federal government imposed, for the year 1918 only, an alternative tax, ranging up to 80 percent, with the taxpayer paying whichever was higher. In 1921,  the excess profits tax was repealed despite powerful attempts to make it permanent. In 1933 and 1935, Congress enacted two mild excess profits taxes as supplements to a capital stock tax.

The crisis of World War II led Congress to pass four excess profits statutes between 1940 and 1943. The 1940 rates ranged from 25 to 50 percent and the 1941 ones from 35 to 60 percent. In 1942, a flat rate of 90 percent was adopted, with a postwar refund of 10 percent; in 1943 the rate was increased to 95 percent, with a 10 percent refund. Congress gave corporations two alternative excess profits tax credit choices: either 95 percent of average earnings for 1936–1939 or an invested capital credit, initially 8 percent of capital but later graduated from 5 to 8 percent. In 1945 Congress repealed the tax, effective 1 January 1946. The Korean War induced Congress to reimpose an excess profits tax, effective from 1 July 1950 to 31 December 1953. The tax rate was 30 percent of excess profits with the top corporate tax rate rising from 45% to 47%, a 70 percent ceiling for the combined corporation and excess profits taxes.

In 1991, some members of Congress sought unsuccessfully to pass an excess profits tax of 40 percent upon the larger oil companies as part of energy policy.
Some social reformers have championed a peacetime use of the excess profits tax, but such proposals face strong opposition from businesses and some economists, who argue that it would create a disincentive to capital investment.

See also
 Windfall profits tax

Notes

Further reading
 Billings, Mark, and Lynne Oats. "Innovation and pragmatism in tax design: Excess Profits Duty in the UK during the First World War." Accounting History Review 24.2-3 (2014): 83-101.

External links

  Why Tax Corporations?

Corporate taxation in the United States